George Stuart Dole (January 30, 1885 – September 6, 1928) was an American wrestler who competed in the 1908 Summer Olympics. In 1908, he won the gold medal in the freestyle featherweight class.

In 1997, Dole was inducted into the National Wrestling Hall of Fame as a Distinguished Member.

References

1885 births
1928 deaths
Wrestlers at the 1908 Summer Olympics
American male sport wrestlers
Olympic gold medalists for the United States in wrestling
Medalists at the 1908 Summer Olympics
Sportspeople from Ypsilanti, Michigan
19th-century American people
20th-century American people